Albert Victor Bramble (1884–1963) was an English actor and film director. He began his acting career on the stage. He started acting in films in 1913 and subsequently turned to directing and producing films. He died on 17 May 1963.

Filmography

Director
 Jimmy (1916)
 Fatal Fingers (1916)
 When Paris Sleeps (1917)
 Profit and the Loss (1917)
 The Laughing Cavalier (1917)
 Bonnie Mary (1918)
 The Single Man (1918)
 Her Cross (1919)
 A Smart Set (1919)
 Heart and Soul (1919)
 Wuthering Heights (1920)
 Torn Sails (1920)
 Mr. Gilfil's Love Story (1920)
 Her Benny (1920)
 The Will (1921)
 The Prince and the Beggarmaid
 The Rotters (1921)
 The Old Country (1921)
 The Bachelor's Club (1921)
 The Little Mother (1922)
 Shirley (1922)
 The Card (1922)
 Zeebrugge (1924)
 Bodiam Castle and Eric the Slender (1926)
 The Man Who Changed His Name (1928)
 Shooting Stars (1928)
 Chick (1928)
 A Lucky Sweep (1932)
 The Veteran of Waterloo (1933, short)
 Mrs. Dane's Defence (1933)

Actor
 The Loss of the Birkenhead (1914)
 The Idol of Paris (1914)
 The Courage of a Coward (1914)
 Her Luck in London (1914)
 The Suicide Club (1914)
 Wild Oats (1915)
 The World's Desire (1915)
 There's Good in Everyone (1915)
 The Mystery of a Hansom Cab (1915)
 Shadows (1915)
 Motherhood (1915)
 Midshipman Easy (1915)
 Honeymoon for Three (1915)
 Home (1915)
 Her Nameless Child (1915)
 From Shopgirl to Duchess (1915)
 At the Torrent's Mercy (1915)
 Another Man's Wife (1915)
 The World's Desire (1915)
 Florence Nightingale (1915)
 Jimmy (1916)
 Fatal Fingers (1916)
 A Soldier and a Man (1916)
 When Paris Sleeps (1917)
 Nearer My God to Thee (1917)
 Broken Threads (1917)
 The Cost of a Kiss (1917)
 The Laughing Cavalier (1917)
 Towards the Light (1918)
 The Touch of a Child (1918)
 The Message (1918)
 The Hanging Judge (1918)
 Becket (1923)
 The Rolling Road (1928)
 Outcast of the Islands (1952)

References

External links

1880s births
1963 deaths
English film directors
English male film actors
English male silent film actors
English male stage actors
Male actors from Portsmouth
20th-century English male actors
Mass media people from Portsmouth